Florența Albu (December 1, 1934 – February 3, 2000) was a Romanian poet.

Biography
She was born in Floroaica, Călărași County. She studied at the Gheorghe Șincai High School in Bucharest from 1948 to 1952, and then pursued her studies at the Faculty of Philology of the University of Bucharest, from 1952 to 1957. She worked at the newspaper Scînteia tineretului from 1963 to 1965; and the journal Viața Românească from 1965 to 1995.

Albu died in Bucharest at Fundeni Hospital in 2000, and was buried in Gruiu.

Works
Tânărul scriitor (1954)
Fără popas, Editura pentru literatură, 1961
Măşti de priveghi (1968)
Arborele vieții (1971)
Petrecere cu iarbă (1973)
Elegii (1973)
65 poeme (1978)
Kilometrul unu în cer (1988)
"Himera nisipurilor, Roata lumii, Euri posibile". Streiflicht – Eine Auswahl zeitgenössischer rumänischer Lyrik (81 rumänische Autoren)
"Lumina piezișă", translated Christian W. Schenk, Dionysos Verlag 1994,

English translations
"LEFT–RIGHT...("STANG–DREPT…")", Centre for Romanian Studies, 11 July 2003
"Bucharest Carol", Transcript Review, Vol 7

Non-fiction
Câmpia soarelui 1962

References

1934 births
2000 deaths
People from Călărași County
Romanian women poets
University of Bucharest alumni
20th-century Romanian women writers
20th-century Romanian poets